Bremilham, also known as Cowage or Cowich, is a small settlement and former civil parish in Wiltshire, England. It is near the hamlet of Foxley in the parish of Norton.

The place-name 'Bremilham' is first attested in 1065, as 'Bremelham', and means 'village where brambles or blackberries grew'. In 1831, the population of the parish was 33. On some present-day maps, only Cowage Farm is shown.

Bremilham was a small ecclesiastical parish until 1893 when it was united with Foxley. In 1934 Foxley (with Bremilham) was transferred to the civil parish of Norton.

Church
There was probably a chapel at Bremilham in 1179, when Amesbury Priory was granted the tithes; by 1289 there was a rector. In 1874 the benefice was united with Foxley, and from 1951 Foxley with Bremilham was held in plurality with that of Corston with Rodbourne. Today the parish is part of the Gauzebrook group of churches.

Bremilham's tiny Church of England church claims to be the smallest in England, measuring ten feet by eleven feet. It is either the surviving part of a 15th-century church (Historic England) or a mid-nineteenth century rebuild on the site of the chancel of the demolished church, for use as a mortuary chapel (Victoria County History). The building was recorded as Grade II listed in 1986.

One service is held each year. The church has no dedication and the parish registers go back only to 1813.

On 26 or 27 February 2020 the church bell, which used to hang on an oak beam inside the church, was stolen.

References

Hamlets in Wiltshire
Former civil parishes in Wiltshire